The 1998 Bournemouth International was a men's tennis tournament played on Clay in Bournemouth, Great Britain that was part of the International Series of the 1998 ATP Tour. It was the third edition of the tournament and was held from 14 September until 20 September 1998. Félix Mantilla  won the singles title.

Finals

Singles

 Félix Mantilla defeated  Albert Costa, 6–3, 7–5

Doubles

 Neil Broad /  Kevin Ullyett defeated  Wayne Arthurs /  Alberto Berasategui, 7–6, 6–3

References

Bournemouth International
Brighton International
Bright